Vardakar is a village in the Artik Municipality of the Shirak Province of Armenia.

Demographics
The population of the village since 1831 is as follows:

Development programs 
Vardakar village became part of COAF-supported villages (Children of Armenia Fund) in 2016. Children of Armenia Fund also renovated village facilities such as Cafeteria and Brushodrome.

The programs implemented include: Debate Clubs, Health and Lifestyle Education, School Nutrition & Brushodromes, Women Health Screenings, Support for Reproductive Health.

See also 

 Shirak province
 Children of Armenia Fund

References 

Populated places in Shirak Province